James Garfield Durham (October 7, 1881 – May 7, 1949) was an American baseball player, a pitcher in Major League Baseball. He played for the Chicago White Sox in 1902. He also had a minor part in the movie New in Town.

References

External links

1881 births
1949 deaths
Major League Baseball pitchers
Chicago White Sox players
Wichita Jobbers players
Baseball players from Kansas
Minor league baseball managers
Cedar Rapids Rabbits players
Indianapolis Indians players
Kansas City Cowboys (minor league) players
Kansas City Blues (baseball) players
Great Bend Millers players
Hutchinson Salt Miners players
Altoona Mountaineers players
Lancaster Red Roses players
Louisville Colonels (minor league) players
Southwestern Moundbuilders baseball players
St. Joseph Drummers players
Pueblo Indians players
Wichita Witches players
Colorado Springs Millionaires players
People from Douglass, Kansas